Michel Kelly-Gagnon is a Canadian lawyer and businessman born in 1971. He graduated in law from the Université de Montréal and was admitted to the Quebec Bar in 1994. He is currently the president and CEO of the Montreal Economic Institute.

Career
After practicing law with Colas & Associates, Kelly-Gagnon went into business as an associate of Formatrad, an in-house employee training firm. In 1998, he assumed leadership of the Montreal Economic Institute (MEI). The annual budget was $15,000 in 1998 and rose to $1 400 393 by 2005. To achieve this growth, he explained that he raised funds from corporations and wealthy individuals in Canada and the US by offering to represent their interests.

In 2006, he became the president of the Quebec Employers Council where he changed an operational deficit of $110,196 the year before his arrival, into a $205,804 surplus after his first year. In 2009, he returned to the MEI as president and moved the organisation from a $269,342 deficit for financial year ending December 31, 2008 to a $153,188 surplus (as of December 31, 2009) in the context of a severe recession.
From 2006 to 2009, he also served on the board of directors of Quebec Workers Compensation Board (CSST). He is also member of the Mont Pelerin Society, president of the advisory committee of Global  Humaines, and he is in the board of directors of the Fondation universitaire Pierre Arbour, the John W. Dobson Foundation, and the Canadian Youth Business Foundation (CYBF).

Kelly-Gagnon was one of six individuals from the province of Quebec honoured in Canada’s Top 40 Under 40 2008 awards.

Published books
 Chroniques économiques : Des idées pour démystifier les politiques publiques (Montreal: Varia, 2004).

Other
 Un budget assorti à la réalité politique, Montreal Economic Institute (April 2010), URL: http://www.iedm.org/main/show_editorials_fr.php?editorials_id=831
 Un dialogue crucial – Le Québec aurait tort de maintenir une attitude négative envers l’Alberta, Montreal Economic Institute (January 2010), URL: http://www.iedm.org/main/show_editorials_fr.php?editorials_id=804
 Trust the owners - Companies need flexibility in choosing how much to pay their executives, Montreal Economic Institute (January 2010), URL: https://web.archive.org/web/20100315171850/http://www.iedm.org/main/show_editorials_fr.php?editorials_id=798
 Business elite deserves big bucks: Executive pay should concern only shareholders – nobody else, Montreal Economic Institute (January 2010), URL: https://web.archive.org/web/20100315172034/http://www.iedm.org/main/show_editorials_fr.php?editorials_id=799
 Le Point sur l'explosion des dépenses du gouvernement fédéral américain, Montreal Economic Institute (March 2009), URL: http://www.iedm.org/uploaded/pdf/point0309.pdf

References 

Canadian lawyers
Université de Montréal alumni
1971 births
Living people